Sajjad Ahmed (born 20 May 1974) is a former Bangladeshi cricketer who played in two One Day Internationals in 1995.

He was only 19 when he was selected to open against Zimbabwe at Dhaka in autumn 1993. Though these games were not recognized as full ODIs, they were important for Bangladesh's preparation for the 5th ICC Trophy in Kenya. Unfortunately, the young opener couldn't handle the pace of Heath Streak.  He did play two full ODIs in 1995, but after scores of 4 and 11, was omitted from the national team.

He played first-class cricket for Dhaka Metropolis and Dhaka Division from 2001 to 2006. He scored his only first-class century for Dhaka Metropolis in a victory over Barisal Division in 2000–01.

References

1974 births
Living people
Bangladesh One Day International cricketers
Bangladeshi cricketers
Dhaka Division cricketers
Dhaka Metropolis cricketers
Cricketers from Dhaka